The list of ship launches in 1694 includes a chronological list of some ships launched in 1694.


References

1694
Ship launches